The El Cielo Biosphere Reserve (Reserva de la Biosfera El Cielo in Spanish) is located in the Sierra Madre Oriental in the southern part of the Mexican state of Tamaulipas near the town of Gómez Farias. The reserve protects the northernmost extension of tropical forest and cloud forest in Mexico.

The state of Tamaulipas protected the area in 1985 and in 1987 it was formally recognized as a biosphere reserve by UNESCO's Man and the Biosphere Programme.

History

The El Cielo area attracted little attention until the 1930s. In 1935, A Canadian farmer and horticulturalist named John William Francis (Frank, Francisco, or Pancho) Harrison established a homestead he named Rancho El Cielo at  elevation in the cloud forest. Noted ornithologist George Miksch Sutton began fieldwork in Mexico in the late 1930s, and by 1941 Sutton and Olin Sewall Pettingill Jr. embarked on a series of extended stays in the Gómez Farias region and found their way to Harrison's small ranch followed by a succession of ornithological publications.  Sutton's protégé, Paul S. Martin also conducted extensive fieldwork in the region from 1948 to 1953, publishing herpetological studies that culminated with his Biogeography of Reptiles and Amphibians in the Gómez Farias Region, Tamaulipas, Mexico, considered by some to be one of the finer examples of a biogeography in any region or discipline, "a classic treatise in historical biogeography". Extensive logging and roads penetrated the area in the 1950s. In 1965, to protect the ecosystem, Harrison transferred his land to a non-profit corporation in cooperation with Texas Southmost College and the Gorgas Science Foundation. In 1966, Harrison was murdered in a land dispute with local farmers.

Harrison's farm is now the El Cielo Biological Research Center (or Rancho del Cielo). In 1983, the Gorgas Science Foundation established Rancho El Cielito by purchasing land along the Sabinas River, just outside the reserve, to preserve part of a riparian ecosystem.

Geography

The  reserve has two core areas in which most human travel and exploitation are prohibited.  One,  in area, protects tropical forests while the larger core area of  includes a cross section of the altitudes and climates of the area, especially the cloud forest. The remainder of the reserve is a buffer zone in which human activities, including limited logging, is permitted. Several communities within the reserve offer facilities for visitors and are reachable by road. An ecological interpretive center is reached by paved road a few miles west of the town of Gómez Farías. The interpretive center, located at an elevation of  offers good views of the tropical forest and facilities for visitors.

The reserve occupies portions of four Mexican municipalities in the state of Tamaulipas: Jaumave, Llera de Canales, Gómez Farías, and Ocampo. The principal access is a road, initially paved, from the town of Gomez Farias into the interior and higher elevations. The community of Alta Cima (also known as Altas Cimas), at an elevation of  has modest lodging and restaurants for visitors. Camping is allowed.

The highest point in the reserve is  located at 23 14N, 99 30W. The reserve is characterized by steep, north-south trending mountain ranges, eastern extensions of the Sierra Madre Oriental, made up of limestone. Typical of karst topography, caves, sinkholes, and rock outcrops are common.

Flora

Several distinct vegetation types are found in the reserve. Vegetation in the drier northern and western portions of the reserve up to an elevation of  consists of desert and semi-desert shrublands, the montane Tamaulipan matorral and the lowland Tamaulipan mezquital. Shrubs and small trees generally do not exceed  in height except in riparian locations.

The El Cielo cloud forests receive precipitation of about  annually.

These forested highland areas are drier than the cloud forests with an average precipitation of  annually.

All of the vegetation types experience a wet season from May to October and a dry season from November to April. More than 1,000 species of plants have been recorded from the cloud forests consisting of 56 percent tropical species, 20 percent temperate, 19 percent cosmopolitan, and 5 percent other.  Included are species associated with the temperate climate of the eastern United States such as maple (Acer skutchii), hickory (Carya ovata), hornbeam (Carpinus tropicalis), and redbud (Cercis canadensis).

Fauna
Mammals: Six species of cats, none abundant, are found in the reserve: jaguar, mountain lion, ocelot, margay, jaguarundi, and bobcat. A small population of black bears is also present. At least 255 species of birds are resident in the reserve and more than 175 migratory species have been recorded.  Both birds and mammals are a mixture of temperate and tropical species.

The large cats, jaguars and mountain lions, are generally regarded favorably by the people living in the reserve. Mountain lions are more often seen in the cloud forests and the higher elevations of the reserve, while jaguars are more common in the lower-elevation tropical forests.
The investigators estimated a density of six jaguars per . The principal prey animals of the jaguar are the lowland paca, Central American red brocket deer, white-tail deer, Virginia opossum, collared peccary, racoon, and great curassow. In addition the jaguar sometimes preys on domestic animals.

Birds: The area is very rich in bird diversity, just a few of the tropical species occurring in the area include the bare-throated tiger-heron (Tigrisoma mexicanum), boat-billed heron (Cochlearius cochlearius), plumbeous kite (Ictinia plumbea), ornate hawk-eagle (Spizaetus ornatus), bat falcon (Falco rufigularis), great curassow (Crax rubra), yellow-headed parrot (Amazona oratrix), military macaw (Ara militaris), squirrel cuckoo (Piaya cayana), northern potoo (Nyctibius jamaicensis), green-breasted mango (Anthracothorax prevostii), mountain trogon (Trogon mexicanus), blue-crowned motmot (Momotus momota), pale-billed woodpecker (Campephilus guatemalensis), ivory-billed woodcreeper (Xiphorhynchus flavigaster), barred antshrike (Thamnophilus doliatus), yellow-throated euphonia (Euphonia hirundinacea).

Reptiles: Although Morelet’s crocodile (Crocodylus moreletii) and several species of turtles occur in Tamaulipas, they are largely absent from the mountain slopes of El Cielo, however, the Mexican box turtle (Terrapene mexicana) has been recorded at lower elevation in the area. Paul Martin recorded 24 species of lizards and 44 snakes. Lizards include lower elevation species like the casque-headed lizard (Laemanctus serratus), Mexican spiny-tailed iguana (Ctenosaura acanthura), and rainbow ameiva (Holcosus amphigrammus). Higher elevations support populations of banded arboreal alligator lizard (Abronia taeniata), minor spiny lizard (Sceloporus minor), Dice’s short-nosed skink (Plestiodon dicei), Madrean tropical night lizard (Lepidophyma sylvaticum), and the flathead knob-scaled lizard (Xenosaurus platyceps).

The Tamaulipan montane gartersnake (Thamnophis mendax) is endemic to El Cielo. Other snake snakes include the boa constrictor (Boa [constrictor] imperator), speckled racer (Drymobius margaritiferus), mountain earth snake (Geophis latifrontalis), blunthead tree snake (Imantodes cenchoa), Mexican parrot snake (Leptophis mexicanus), brown vine snake (Oxybelis aeneus), Gaige’s pine forest snake (Rhadinaea gaigeae), tropical tree snake (Spilotes pullatus), and the terrestrial snail sucker (Tropidodipsas sartorii). Venomous snakes like the Tamaulipas rock rattlesnake (Crotalus morulus) and Totonacan rattlesnake (Crotalus totonacus) occur in the cloud forest, and the terciopelo (Bothrops asper) can be found on the lower slopes.

Amphibians: Two endemic salamanders are known from, the El Cielo salamander (Chiropterotriton cieloensis) and graceful flat-footed salamander (Chiropterotriton cracens). Other species include the Tamaulipan false brook salamander (Aquiloeurycea scandens), broadfoot mushroomtongue salamander (Bolitoglossa platydactyla) and Bell’s salamander (Isthmura bellii). Frogs and toads from the region include the Rio Grande leopard frog (Lithobates berlandieri), Mexican treefrog (Smilisca baudinii), small-eared treefrog (Rheohyla miotympanum), mountain treefrog (Dryophytes eximius), long-footed chirping frog (Eleutherodactylus longipes), and predominantly subterranean species like the barking frog (Craugastor augusti) and Adorned Robber frog (Craugastor decoratus). At lower elevations the sabinal frog (Leptodactylus melanonotus), veined treefrog (Trachycephalus [vermiculatus] typhonius, sheep frog (Hypopachus variolosus), and the burrowing toad (Rhinophrynus dorsalis) may be found.

Fishes: Although the steep mountain slopes and karstic environment do not support a large fish diversity, lower elevation tributaries in the Rio Guayalejo drainage, such as the Rio Sabinas and Rio Frio and associated springs and creeks contain species like the longnose gar (Lepisosteus osseus), red shiner (Cyprinella lutrensis), lantern minnow (Dionda ipni), pigmy shiner (Notropis tropicus), Mexican tetra (Astyanax mexicanus), gold gambusia (Gambusia aurata), Forlón gambusia (Gambusia regani), Gulf gambusia (Gambusia vittata), mountain swordtail (Xiphophorus nezahualcoyotl), and variable platyfish (Xiphophorus variatus), Tamesí molly (Poecilia latipunctata), and the Amazon molly (Poecilia formosa), an all female species, reproduces through gynogenesis. The phantom blindcat (Prietella lundbergi) is known only from subterranean waters and has been collected by cave drivers at depths of 50 meters in Rio Frio cave systems.

Climate

The climate of Gómez Farías, to the east, is typical of the lower and wetter elevations of the reserve. Higher elevations are substantially cooler and precipitation declines rapidly on the western slopes of the mountains. The Sierra Madre Oriental create a rain shadow effect. The town of Jaumave, Tamaulipas at the northwestern entrance to the reserve receives only  of precipitation annually and has a semi-arid, near-desert climate. Freezing temperatures are rare at the lower elevations of El Cielo, but common in winter at elevations of more than

References

Tourist attractions in Tamaulipas
Protected areas of Tamaulipas
Geography of Tamaulipas
Biosphere reserves of Mexico
Protected areas of the Sierra Madre Oriental
Tropical and subtropical moist broadleaf forests
Veracruz moist forests
Cloud forests of Mexico